Michelle Denee Carter (born October 12, 1985) is an American shot putter. She is the current American record holder in the event with a distance of  set at the 2016 Olympic Games. She was inducted into the Texas Track and Field Hall of Fame in 2018.

Career
Carter won the 2016 gold medal at the Rio Olympics on the last of her six throws, edging two-time defending champion Valerie Adams of New Zealand. In doing so, Carter became the first United States women's athlete to win the event since the women's competition began at the 1948 Summer Olympic Games in London, and only the second American to win any medal in the event (Earlene Brown, bronze, 1960).

She finished fifteenth at the 2008 Olympic Games and fourth at the 2012 Olympic Games.

A bronze medalist at the 2015 and 2017 IAAF World Championships, Carter also won the gold medal at the 2016 World Indoor Championships after winning the bronze in 2012.

She won the silver medal at the 2001 World Youth Championships and the gold medal at the 2004 World Junior Championships.

In addition to winning the 2008 United States Olympic Team Trials, she was the 2009, 2011, 2013, 2014, 2015 and 2016 national champion. While competing for the University of Texas, she won the NCAA collegiate national championship in 2006. In college, she was a seven-time All-American, and also won the Big 12 Conference title five times. In 2006, she won the NCAA indoor title to also help the University of Texas women claim the NCAA team title. With a runner-up finish in the shot put at the 2005 outdoor meet, Carter helped the Longhorns win the NCAA championship.

Carter is a graduate of Red Oak High School in Red Oak, Texas where she was a four-time state champion in the shot put.

Personal life
Carter's father, Michael Carter, is also a former Olympian and NFL star — the only athlete to win an Olympic medal and a Super Bowl ring in the same year. Since 1979, her father currently holds the boys' national high school record in the shot put; Michelle held the girls' record from 2003 to 2014. Michael Carter won the men's shot put silver medal while representing Team USA at the Los Angeles 1984 Olympic Games and also played professional American football for the San Francisco 49ers from 1984-1992, winning three Super Bowls.

Carter is a Christian. Carter has said, "Through faith and sports, I've learned discipline and self-control. In the Bible, God tells us we have to work, even if what we want is not going to happen right away. People want a platform, but with that comes responsibility. Before winning the gold medal, I needed to be in a mature place to handle the opportunities that were going to come my way, to make sure I didn't use them for my advantage. You have to put your pride aside and let God's plan come through. He has given me this platform for Him to shine." She has also said "I know God allowed me to have this medal, and with it I want to glorify Him and point others to Him."

Carter received a track scholarship at the University of Texas. She graduated in 2007 with a degree in youth and communities studies, and a minor in kinesiology.

Carter is a certified professional make-up artist. She was inducted into the Texas Track and Field Hall of Fame in 2018.

Carter has focused on body image both on and off the field, talking to young women about confidence through her program You Throw Girl. "You have to understand everyone's body was built to do something. I was built to do something, and that's how I was built. I think the world is realizing we were promoting one body type and there have always been many."

Michelle Carter announced her retirement from professional sports on her podcast in January 2023.

References

External links
 
 
 
 University of Texas Athletics Hall of Honor
 The Podium Life Podcast with Michelle Carter

1985 births
Living people
Track and field athletes from San Jose, California
American female shot putters
African-American female track and field athletes
Athletes (track and field) at the 2008 Summer Olympics
Athletes (track and field) at the 2012 Summer Olympics
Athletes (track and field) at the 2016 Summer Olympics
Pan American Games medalists in athletics (track and field)
Athletes (track and field) at the 2011 Pan American Games
World Athletics Championships athletes for the United States
World Athletics Championships medalists
Pan American Games bronze medalists for the United States
Olympic gold medalists for the United States in track and field
Texas Longhorns women's track and field athletes
Medalists at the 2016 Summer Olympics
Olympic female shot putters
USA Outdoor Track and Field Championships winners
USA Indoor Track and Field Championships winners
World Athletics Indoor Championships winners
Medalists at the 2011 Pan American Games
21st-century African-American sportspeople
21st-century African-American women
20th-century African-American people
20th-century African-American women